Rayne Longboards is a Canadian longboard manufacturer. Rayne Longboards are shipped to retail shops in many countries, and are also sold through their online store. The specialized boards are made for downhill racing, freeriding, city riding, and long distance pushing.

History

Rayne Longboards was established in 2004 by owner and operator Graham Buksa. He began by producing longboard decks at their factory located in North Vancouver, British Columbia. The business later expanded to produce a range of products including skateboards,  longboards, snowskates and powsurfers.

In 2008, Rayne developed a manufacturing system for producing boards entirely from bamboo and fibreglass, which have a better strength to weight ratio, are more water resistant, and hold their flex longer than traditional maple made boards.

Early 2009, the brand released a light-weight composite constructed board, labelled as Dee-lite, aimed at the downhill racing market. The four models give the racers more manoeuvrability while not compromising the strength or rigidity of the boards.

In 2009, Rayne Longboards introduced a concave shape to a few of their boards, to improve the fit between the rider's foot and the board.

Beginning in 2013, Rayne began designing thinner and lighter boards with more wheel clearance, manufactured with a thick bamboo core going down the middle of the deck that tapers off towards the edges where wider layers of bamboo are then applied. Also in 2013, Rayne began re-releasing some of their original boards, marketing them as the Heritage Series.

Accessories
As their business grew, Rayne began to sell wheels, safety gear, and other accessories. Some of the excess wood, left over after the intended shape is cut out, is then repurposed as belt buckles, riser pads, and wall tiles to reduce manufacturing waste.

In 2012, Rayne began importing  urethane wheels from the United States as an addition to their product line.  Each set of wheels comes with a durometer to accommodate for user and setup preferences.

As of the winter season of 2015/2016, Rayne began offering snow products, including a snowskate and powersurf.

Team
The Rayne Longboards employs a team of international and younger riders to test and demonstrate their products. Rayne features a signature series line featuring the Gmack, Fortune, and Misfortune each designed by their respective pro riders.

References

External links
 Rayne Longboards

2004 establishments in Canada
Skateboarding companies